Anthony Phelps (born August 25, 1928) is a Haitian Canadian writer, whose novel La contrainte de l’inachevé was a Governor General's Literary Award nominee for French-language fiction at the 2007 Governor General's Awards.

Born in Port-au-Prince, Phelps attended Seton Hall University to study chemistry. Alongside Davertige, Serge Legagneur, Roland Morisseau and René Philoctète, he was a founder of the Haiti Littéraire writing circle and the literary journal Semences. An opponent of the dictatorial regime of François Duvalier, he was forced into exile in 1964 and settled in Montreal, Quebec, where he continued to write and worked in television and theatre. His works have included the poetry collections Été (1960), Éclats de silence (1962), Points cardinaux (1966), Mon pays que voici suivi de Les dits du Fouaux-cailloux (1968), Motifs pour le temps saisonnier (1976), La bélière caraïbe (1980), Même le soleil est nu (1983) and Orchidée nègre (1985); the novels Moins l'infini (1973), Mémoire en colin-maillard (1976) and Haïti! Haïti! (1985, with Gary Klang); the children's story collection Et moi, je suis une île (1973); and the stage play Le conditionnel (1968).

He won the Casa de las Américas Prize in 1985 for Orchidée nègre. In 2016, he was a recipient of the Prix Carbet de la Caraïbe et du Tout-Monde for his body of work.

References

1928 births
Living people
20th-century Canadian novelists
20th-century Canadian poets
20th-century Canadian dramatists and playwrights
20th-century Canadian short story writers
20th-century Canadian male writers
20th-century Haitian novelists
20th-century Haitian poets
20th-century Haitian dramatists and playwrights
Canadian male novelists
Canadian male poets
Canadian male short story writers
Canadian male dramatists and playwrights
Canadian novelists in French
Canadian poets in French
Canadian short story writers in French
Canadian dramatists and playwrights in French
Haitian male novelists
Haitian male poets
Haitian male short story writers
Haitian male dramatists and playwrights
Haitian emigrants to Canada
Black Canadian writers
People from Port-au-Prince
Writers from Montreal